Entebbe General Hospital, commonly known as Entebbe Hospital, is a hospital in the town of Entebbe, in the Central Region of Uganda.

Location
The coordinates of the hospital are:0°03'50.0"N, 32°28'18.0"E (Latitude:0.063874; Longitude:32.471655).

Overview
Entebbe General Hospital is a public hospital funded by the Uganda Ministry of Health. Originally built by the British colonialists in the 20th century as Entebbe Grade B Hospital, the facility was closed temporarily in December 2013. Between December 2013 and May 2016, the hospital was rebuilt and expanded from 100 to 200 beds at a cost of US$7 million (about UGX:23.2 billion), donated by the World Bank. The new facility has a private fee-for-service wing and a public, free-service wing. Other services include pediatrics, radiology, laboratory, maternity, immunization, general surgery, internal medicine, orthopedics  and operating rooms. Patients served come from Wakiso District, Mpigi District, Entebbe Town, and the neighboring islands in Lake Victoria.

Recent developments
The hospital featured prominently during the two COVID-19 pandemic waves in Uganda, one in 2020 and another 2021. According to Dr Moses Muwanga, the medical director, at one time during the second wave, the 200-bed hospital had 160 Covid-19 inpatients. The Daily Monitor newspaper referred to the hospital as Entebbe Regional Referral Hospital.

See also
List of hospitals in Uganda

References

Hospitals in Uganda
Wakiso District
Entebbe